The first season of the Hot in Cleveland, an American situation comedy television series, aired in the United States on TV Land. The series was the channel's first venture into scripted television series. Created by television producer and writer Suzanne Martin, the show was produced by Hazy Mills Productions, SamJen Productions, TV Land Original Productions while Martin, Sean Hayes, Todd Milliner, Lynda Obst, Larry W. Jones, and Keith Cox served as executive producers. The show focuses on three women from Los Angeles who unexpectedly crash land in Cleveland, Ohio and, enthralled by the attention the receive, decide to move there. The series stars Valerie Bertinelli, Wendie Malick and Jane Leeves as the three Los Angeles women Melanie Moretti, Victoria Chase, and Joy Scroggs. Veteran actress Betty White also stars in the series as Elka Ovstrosky, the women's sassy caretaker. The season also featured numerous guest stars, including John Schneider, Susan Lucci, Carl Reiner and Joe Jonas.

Consisting of ten episodes, the first season aired from June 16 to August 18, 2010 on Wednesdays at 10:00 p.m. EST. The series debuted to 4.75 million viewers, becoming the most watched program on the channel and more than quintupling their viewership. The season ended with the finale "Tornado", which attracted 3.40 million viewers. The season averaged 3.12 million viewers per episode and a 0.8 Nielsen rating. Hot in Cleveland also aired in Australia, Canada, New Zealand, and the United Kingdom to ratings success. Critical reception for the series was positive, with many television critics praising the main cast's performance, most notably White, and the series as "well-acted" and "funny." Hot in Cleveland also garnered several comparisons to the 1980s NBC sitcom The Golden Girls, which White also starred in.
  
The entire season was released on DVD in Region 1 on January 11, 2011, Region 2 on April 25, 2011, and Region 4 on February 17, 2011.

Plot
The series begins with trio of single women living in Los Angeles - minorly successful writer Melanie Moretti, whose children are in college and who is going through a divorce, Victoria Chase, a soap opera and Lifetime movie actress best known for portraying Honor St. Raven on the recently cancelled soap opera drama Edge of Tomorrow, and British beautician and LA celebrity eyebrow specialist Joy Scroggs - boarding a plane headed for Paris for a vacation to do some actions outlined on Melanie's newest book "200 Things Every Woman Should Do Before She Dies". On the plane, Melanie runs into her estranged husband Anders, who is on vacation with his new fiancee, Kim, the woman he cheated on Melanie with during their marriage. As she sulks on the plane and is comforted by her friends, a lightning storm causes the plane to make an emergency landing in Cleveland.

Upon arriving at a Cleveland bar, the women are fascinated when men look at and start hitting on them. They talk with a trio of men, one of whom, Hank, shows Melanie the sights of Cleveland and sleeps with her. Melanie then impulsively decides to move to Cleveland, despite Joy and Victoria warning her not to. She rents a cottage, which comes with a Polish caretaker, Elka Ostrovsky, a sassy elderly woman with a storied life and an instant dislike of Joy. Melanie goes out on another date with Hank, who Joy and Victoria discover is married. They interrupt the date to call him out on his actions. Melanie ultimately decides to stay in Cleveland to reinvent herself, with Joy and Victoria deciding to stay with her after their failed careers: Victoria discovering that she is only landing grandmother parts and Joy discovering that her clients are using other beauticians for their eyebrows instead of her. The women decide to go pick up guys, where Elka immediately goes as well. In the next episode, it is revealed that Elka got phone numbers from three guys at the bar, and Melanie helps her choose a guy for her first date since her husband's death.

The second episode introduces a personal storyline for Joy, as it is revealed that as a teenager she gave birth to a son, whom she gave up for adoption shortly afterwards. This information the girls reveal to Elka after Joy's younger date makes references to his country of birth and his birth date, making her worried that she is dating her long-lost son. Joy tries to get a DNA sample so she can find out if she is his mother, but he reveals he found his birth mother recently, and breaks up with her. After Victoria goes to the local Big N Easy store to buy many products in bulk and seek a place to vent about her show's cancellation and Melanie Googles photos of Anders and Kim in Paris, the two decide they need to find a way to get closure with their past. Joy cautiously decides to try to track down her son, using an ancestry website online.

The third episode introduces the girls' annual celebration of birthdays on the same day. This becomes known at "Birthdates" when Elka suggests that the three women get each other dates for their birthday, which they agree to do, adding Elka to the tradition. While the other three women are stuck with bad dates with major flaws, Elka's date with Max Miller is more successful and they end up quickly getting engaged during their date. Though Elka does briefly manage to cheat on Max with a fellow senior named Nick during a seniors' dance, she ultimately rebuffs Nick and stays with Max.

The season revolves around Melanie, Joy and Victoria adjusting to life in Cleveland. Melanie throws a party and meets their neighbour Rick, who turns out to hit on the girls relentlessly. Her son Will also comes to visit her, but isn't happy with her meddling in his personal life when she accidentally ruins his secret engagement; though Joy, who is going through a mid-life crisis and is seeing various therapists, helps them reconcile. Victoria runs into an old flame, Johnny Revere, at an event at the Rock and Roll Hall of Fame, and intends to humiliate him for dumping her for no apparent reason, but finds that she cannot, though is surprised when he apologizes to her later. Victoria states that him being a rebel is what she liked about him and they try to recreate the sex they had when they were younger; though after they injure themselves while doing it, they ultimately concede that they are growing up and after sleeping together, part on good terms. Victoria later meets a fan in a high school student and becomes a drama teacher after coaching a school production of Romeo and Juliet, a job she decides to keep at least until her next acting project. Elka later helps her fake an illness to secure her a nomination for the Daytime Emmy Awards, allowing her a chance to beat her longtime soap opera rival Susan Lucci.

While visiting her daughter in New York City to watch her play before a blind date, Melanie runs into Anders again. As the blind date gets cancelled, she and Anders end up making out and he follows her to Cleveland, saying that he and Kim are having relationship problems. She agrees to go out on one dinner date with him, but the day after, Anders tells Victoria and Joy that he has decided to go back home to LA to reconcile with Kim. Furious at Anders but wanting Melanie to have full closure from her marriage, Victoria and Joy convince Anders to let Melanie dump him this time round so she doesn't get hurt. However, just after he leaves and Melanie feels guilty for doing it to him, Victoria and Joy tell her the truth; causing her to rush to the airport to find Anders. She manages to catch up to Anders at baggage check and tells him how she feels - in a profanity-laced telling off berating him for his actions towards her and Kim. Shortly after this incident, Melanie declares she is done with her marriage and throws away her wedding ring; which lands near a police officer named Pete. The two begin talking and eventually begin going out. However, this disturbs everyone else in the house due to their loud sex and overly cheesy affection towards each other, and eventually Joy feels left out when Melanie ends up ignoring her plans with her to spend time with Pete, leading to an incident where Joy accidentally waxes off Melanie's eyebrow while helping her get ready for another date. Elka tells Melanie off for ignoring her friendship with Joy, leading her to apologize to her.

The season finale takes place during a tornado, where the girls hide in the house's storm cellar only to find a large array of stolen antique furniture. Elka states that it was stolen by her late husband, whom she discovered after his death was a fence for the mob. All of it was polished with Elka's special Polish blend containing herbs, thus explaining the marijuana smell on her when they first met. The girls pass the time by complaining about their own situations: Victoria is unable to make it to the Daytime Emmy Awards to potentially beat Lucci, Joy is contacted by her son who wants to meet her but she is unable to contact him due to the communications being knocked out, and Melanie reveals she accidentally said "I love you" to Pete and does not know if he feels the same way. After the girls watch Lucci accept Victoria's Emmy on her behalf on TV, Pete arrives at the cellar to make sure Melanie is okay, when he is distracted upon seeing Elka and the furniture. The season ends with Elka getting arrested and going to jail.

Production
Hot in Cleveland is TV Land's first venture into scripted comedy and is produced by Sean Hayes's Hazy Mills Productions and created by Suzanne Martin, who also serves as the showrunner.  Hayes and Martin, along with Lynda Obst, Larry W. Jones, and Keith Cox, serve as the series' executive producers. Staff writers employed for the season include Martin, Liz Feldman, Anne Flett-Giordano, writing and production duo Sam Johnson and Chris Marcil, Vanessa McCarthy, and Chuck Ranberg. Andy Cadiff, Gil Junger, Michael Lembeck and David Trainer were hired as directors for the season's episodes. The series is shot with a multicamera setup in front of a live studio audience at the CBS Studio City soundstage.

Cast

The series employs a regular of four main actors. Valerie Bertinelli portrays Melanie Moretti, the girl-next-door and best-selling author. Jane Leeves portrayed Rejoyla "Joy" Scroggs, a British born beautician who is cynical and suspicious of everyone. Wendie Malick played Victoria Chase, a vain veteran actress from a recently cancelled soap opera television series who longs for the fame she once experienced. Betty White plays Elka Ostrovsky, a sassy elderly caretaker with a renewed sex life and a general dislike of Joy. In keeping with the theme of TV Land, the cast is composed of actors who appeared in sitcoms that were syndicated on the network. Bertinelli appeared in the 1970 sitcom One Day at a Time (1975). Leeves starred in the Cheers spinoff Frasier (1993). Malick starred in the late 1990s NBC sitcom Just Shoot Me! (1997). White starred in the 1980s NBC hit sitcom The Golden Girls (1985).

During the season, the series employed a number of guest stars some of which appeared in more than one episode. Actor Carl Reiner guest starred as Max, Elka's boyfriend, in three episodes. David Starzyk portrayed Pete, a police officer who becomes romantically involved with Melanie. Bil Dwyer played Melanie's ex-husband Anders in two episodes. The pilot episode featured Tim Bagley as the realtor selling Melanie the house and John Schneider as Hank, a guy Melanie sleeps with on her first night in Cleveland. Actor Robert Gant appears in "Birthdates" as a blind date for Joy, who looks like a wanted killer. In the episode "The Sex That Got Away", musician Huey Lewis portrays rock legend and Victoria's former flame Johnny Revere while Amy Yasbeck portrays Hailey Nash, Melanie's favorite singer with whom she has an uncomfortable encounter. Wayne Knight appeared in "Good Neighbors" as the ladies neighbor Rick. "Meet the Parents" featured veteran actors Shirley Knight, Hal Linden and Juliet Mills portraying Melanie's mother Loretta, Victoria's father Alex and Joy's mother Philippa. Comedian and actor Tim Conway appears in "It's Not That Complicated" as Nick, a man fighting for Elka's love. The episode "The Play's the Thing" features guest actors Gary Anthony Williams and Mark Indelicato portraying Coach Taylor and Zach, a fan of Victoria, respectively. Singer-songwriter Joe Jonas appeared in the episode "Good Luck Faking the Goiter" as Melanie's son Will. Dave Foley also guest stars as Dr. Moore, an expert on the disease that Victoria claims to have. Soap opera actress Susan Lucci guest starred in the season finale "Tornado" as a fictionalized version of herself and Victoria's rival.

Main
 Valerie Bertinelli as Melanie Moretti
 Jane Leeves as Rejoyla "Joy" Scroggs
 Wendie Malick as Victoria Chase
 Betty White as Elka Ostrovsky

Recurring
 Carl Reiner as Max
 David Starzyk as Pete

Special guest stars
 Huey Lewis as Johnny Revere
 Wayne Knight as Rick
 Hal Linden as Alex Chase
 Juliet Mills as Philipa Scroggs
 Shirley Knight as Loretta Moretti
 Joe Jonas as Will
 Dave Foley as Dr. Moore
 Susan Lucci as herself

Guest stars
 John Schneider as Hank Szymborska
 Tim Bagley as Larry
 David Giuntoli as Tyler
 Jack Donner as Arthur
 D.W. Moffett as Chester
 George Newbern as Bill
 Robert Gant as Steve
 Amy Yasbeck as Hailey Nash
 Robin Thede as Janet
 Bil Dwyer as Anders
 Tim Conway as Nick
 Nicole Randall Johnson as Eleanor
 Mark Indelicato as Zack
 Gary Anthony Williams as Coach Taylor
 Chelsea Ricketts as Francesca
 Carole Gutierrez as Dr. Hernandez

Reception

Viewership and ratings
The pilot episode for Hot in Cleveland premiered on TV Land on June 16, 2010 to 4.75 million viewers. The broadcast earned several distinctions for the network, including increasing viewership of the channel and garnering the highest ratings in the adults 18-49 and women aged 25–54 demographic. The season ended with the finale "Tornado", which was viewed by 3.40 million viewers. The season held an average of over 3.12 million viewers and a 0.8 Nielsen rating. The season's viewership average was more than four times the average of another original series on TV Land, Harry Loves Lisa, which had an average of 731,000 viewers.

In Canada, the series debuted on July 5, 2010 to 1.82 million viewers. The season ended on September 23, 2010 with 1.59 million viewers tuning in to the finale. In the United Kingdom, the first season of Hot in Cleveland aired on the Sky Living network and ranked among the top ten most-watched programs on the network each weak, with its peak viewership at 347,000 viewers. Hot in Cleveland'''s first season aired in Australia on the Nine Network during the summer of 2010. Each episode ranked within the top twenty most-watched programs on Monday nights, acquiring between 800,000 and 1.3 million viewers. In New Zealand, the season aired on TV2 more a year after its broadcast in the United States. The season averaged over 457,000 viewers per episode.

Critical reviews
Upon the premiere of the pilot episode, Hot in Cleveland received positive reviews from television critics. At Metacritic, which assigns a weighted mean rating out of 100 to reviews from television critics, the show received an average score of 65, which indicates "generally favorable review", based on 23 reviews. Scott D. Pierce of Deseret News called the pilot "bright, funny and witty" while drawing comparisons to the 1980s NBC sitcom The Golden Girls. Philadelphia Inquirer writer Jonathan Storm deemed the series "funny and fresh" while noting that the actresses "appear to be having the time of their lives." Television columnist Brian Lowry, writing for Variety, spoke positively about the series, lauding the actresses performance and the comedic material utilized. Lowry added that the series "feels as though it could have been on a network lineup 20 years ago, which is surprisingly better than that sounds." Verne Gay, writing for Newsday, called the series "by-the-numbers sitcom with a couple of laughs, an inoffensive premise and four seasoned actresses who make the material much better than it is." Gay notably highlighted White's performance in the series, calling her timing "impeccable" and her "deadpan delivery flawless." TV Guide columnist Matt Roush had a less positive view about the series, writing "I simply hope Hot in Cleveland can give us more than the lukewarm pilot promises. Ohio deserves better, and so do these fabulous ladies."

The full season later went on receive positive reviews. Nick Hartel of DVD Talk deemed the season release as "Recommended". Praising the actresses performances and the mixture of "old sitcom shenanigans" with "a dose of the modern", Hartel called the series "a pleasant, well-acted, old-school sitcom" and "a series that those in need of a good laugh should check out." DVD Verdict writer Brett Cullum deemed the series "giddy silly fun with a rock solid cast and a star who's almost ninety years old." The staff at Us Weekly gave the season 3 and a half stars, writing that "Sitcom pros Valerie Bertinelli, Wendie Malick and Jane Leeves clearly relish the chance to play rare TV characters -- clever, single middle-aged women -- in this sly series that just gets funnier." Zap2it writer Jay Robbins, writing for Los Angeles Times, praised the lead actresses performances in the season and called White "today's ultimate secret weapon for media success." Troy Patterson of Slate Magazine'' opined that "The only truly original thing about the show is that its humor feels pitched at an extremely strange audience: Its ideal viewer would seem to have developed all her expectations of what comedy is from watching traditional sitcoms and yet to have no memory of hearing these jokes the first 20 times around."

Episodes

Ratings

United States ratings

Canadian ratings

United Kingdom ratings
All viewing figures and ranks are sourced from BARB.

Australian ratings

DVD release

References

General references 
 
 
 

2010 American television seasons
Hot in Cleveland seasons